Gyanesh Mukherjee (5 July 1926 – 8 May 2008) was a Bengali actor, director and theater personality.

Career 
He was involved with Indian People's Theatre Association (IPTA). In his film career, Mukherjee worked with number of famous directors like Ritwik Ghatak, Mrinal Sen and Tapan Sinha. Since the late 1950s to the 1970s, he played a prolific role in cinema as well as theatre. In 1973 he directed the film Achena Atithi which was remade in Hindi as Anjane Mehmaan in 1975. He founded Mass theaters group in Kolkata. Mukherjee passed away in Kolkata on 8 May 2008.

Filmography 
 Ganga
 Achena Atithi
 Ekti Jibon
 Chandaneer
 Hirer Angti
 Meghe Dhaka Tara
 Jukti Takko Aar Gappo
 Pratisodh
 Ekhane Pinjar
 Bari Theke Paliye
 Mrigayaa
 Ajantrik
 Alo (film)
 Khana Baraha
 Priyo Bandhabi
 Mansur Miyar Ghora
 Banashree
 Swikarokti
 Gajamukta
 Tero Nadir Parey
 Rakta Rekha
 Chhotto Jignasa
 Kal Tumi Aleya
 Akash Kusum
 Chhaya Surya
 Baishey Shravana
 Desh
 Janani (1993 film)
 Target (1995 film)
 Damu (1996 film)
 Mukhyamantri (1996 film)

References

External links
 

Bengali male actors
Male actors in Bengali cinema
1926 births
2008 deaths
20th-century Indian male actors
Male actors from Kolkata
Bengali theatre personalities
Indian male stage actors
Indian People's Theatre Association people
Film directors from Kolkata